Nicholas Markanich is a Filipino-American professional soccer player who plays as a forward for USL Championship club Charleston Battery.

Early life 
Markanich was born on December 26, 1999. He grew up in Bourbonnais, Illinois and attended Bradley-Bourbonnais Community High School. He played as part of the Chicago Fire for a period.

In 2018, he matriculated to Northern Illinois University, where he played for the Huskies soccer team. Over his four years at NIU, he started in 68 of his 69 appearances and scored 39 goals.

While at college, Markanich played with USL League Two side Green Bay Voyageurs between 2019 and 2021, without the 2020 season been cancelled due to the COVID-19 pandemic. He made a total of 15 appearances, scoring five goals and tallying three assists.

Career 
Markanich was selected by FC Cincinnati in the 2022 MLS SuperDraft. He was chosen as the 2nd pick in the 2nd round of the draft, or the 30th overall pick. He was signed to a contract for the 2022 season (with options through the 2025 season) on February 21, 2022. He started in FC Cincinnati's first match of the season on February 26. Markanich was released by Cincinnati following their 2022 season.

On February 16, 2023, Markanich signed with USL Championship side Charleston Battery following a successful trial.

Personal life 
Markanich has a twin brother, Anthony Markanich, who also plays soccer. Anthony was drafted by the Colorado Rapids in the 2022 MLS SuperDraft.

References

External links 
 Nicholas Markanich at FC Cincinnati
 Nick Markanich at NIU Huskies

Living people
1999 births
American soccer players
American sportspeople of Filipino descent
Association football forwards
FC Cincinnati draft picks
FC Cincinnati players
FC Cincinnati 2 players
Charleston Battery players
Major League Soccer players
MLS Next Pro players
Northern Illinois Huskies men's soccer players
Soccer players from Illinois
USL League Two players